The 22nd Young Artist Awards ceremony, presented by the Young Artist Association, honored excellence of young performers under the age of 21 in the fields of film and television for the year 2000, and took place on April 1, 2001 at the Sportsmen's Lodge in Studio City, California.

The announcer for the evening was William H. Bassett. The hosts for the evening were Josh Keaton, Ryan Merriman, Kimberly Cullum, Cody McMains, Kaitlin Cullum and Adam Nicholson.

Established in 1978 by long-standing Hollywood Foreign Press Association member, Maureen Dragone, the Young Artist Association was the first organization to establish an awards ceremony specifically set to recognize and award the contributions of performers under the age of 21 in the fields of film, television, theater and music.

Categories
★ Bold indicates the winner in each category.

Best Performance in a Feature Film

Best Performance in a Feature Film: Leading Young Actor
★ Rob Brown – Finding Forrester – Columbia Pictures
Kevin Zegers – MVP: Most Valuable Primate – Keystone Family Pictures
Haley Joel Osment – Pay It Forward – Warner Bros
Ryan Merriman – Just Looking – Sony Pictures Classics
Patrick Fugit – Almost Famous – DreamWorks SKG

Best Performance in a Feature Film: Leading Young Actress
★ Elizabeth Huett – Social Misfits – Our Way Productions
Mara Wilson – Thomas and the Magic Railroad – Destination Films
Jamie Renee Smith – MVP: Most Valuable Primate – Keystone Family Pictures
Natalie Portman – Where the Heart Is – 20th Century Fox
Kirsten Dunst – Bring It On – Universal

Best Performance in a Feature Film: Supporting Young Actor
★ Rory Culkin – You Can Count on Me – Paramount Classics
Rollo Weeks – The Little Vampire – New Line
J. Michael Moncrief – The Legend of Bagger Vance – DreamWorks SKG
Spencer Treat Clark – Gladiator – Universal
Lucas Black – All the Pretty Horses – Miramax

Best Performance in a Feature Film: Supporting Young Actress
★ Hayden Panettiere – Remember the Titans – Disney
Caitlin Wachs – My Dog Skip – Warner Bros
Ashley Johnson – What Women Want – Paramount
Clara Bryant – The Lost Lover – Studio Canal Plus
Thora Birch – Dungeons & Dragons – New Line Cinema

Best Performance in a Feature Film: Young Actor Age Ten or Under
★ Spencer Breslin – Disney's The Kid – Walt Disney
Jake Thomas – The Cell – New Line Cinema
Connor Matheus] – Snow Day – Paramount
Jonathan Lipnicki – The Little Vampire – New Line Cinema

Best Performance in a Feature Film: Young Actress Age Ten or Under
★ Makenzie Vega – The Family Man – Universal
Taylor Momsen – Dr. Seuss' How the Grinch Stole Christmas – Universal
Hallie Kate Eisenberg – Beautiful – Destination Films
Holliston Coleman – Bless the Child – Paramount

Best Performance in a TV Movie

Best Performance in a TV Movie (Drama): Leading Young Actor
★ Michael Schiffman – Finding Buck McHenry – Showtime
Frankie Muniz – Miracle in Lane 2 – Disney Channel
Jonathan Malen – Possessed – Showtime
Aaron Meeks – A Storm in Summer – Showtime
Bobby Edner – The Trial of Old Drum – Animal Planet
Seth Adkins – When Andrew Came Home – Lifetime

Best Performance in a TV Movie (Drama): Leading Young Actress
★ Shadia Simmons – The Color of Friendship – Disney Channel
Madeline Zima – The Sandy Bottom Orchestra – Showtime
Alexa Vega – Run the Wild Fields – Showtime
Kimberlee Peterson – Secret Cutting – USA Network
Lindsey Haun – The Color of Friendship – Disney Channel
Camilla Belle – Rip Girls – Disney Channel

Best Performance in a TV Movie (Drama): Supporting Young Actor
★ Patrick Levis – Miracle in Lane 2 – Disney Channel
Kyle Schmid – The Sandy Bottom Orchestra – Showtime
Addison Ridge – Frankie and Hazel – Showtime
Cameron Finley – One True Love – CBS
Vincent Berry – Baby – TNT

Best Performance in a TV Movie (Drama): Supporting Young Actress
★ Tamara Hope – The Sandy Bottom Orchestra – Showtime
Ingrid Uribe – Frankie and Hazel – Showtime
Courtney Peldon – The Princess and the Barrio Boy – Showtime
Julia McIlvaine – The Lost Child – CBS/Hallmark
Stacie Hess – Rip Girls – Disney Channel

Best Performance in a TV Movie (Comedy): Leading Young Actor
★ Andrew Lawrence – The Other Me – Disney Channel
Bill Switzer – Mail to the Chief – Disney Channel
Robert Ri'chard – Alley Cats Strike – Disney Channel
Matthew O'Leary – Mom's Got a Date with a Vampire – Disney Channel
Taylor Handley – Phantom of the Megaplex – Disney Channel

Best Performance in a TV Movie (Comedy): Leading Young Actress
★ Hallee Hirsh – The Ultimate Christmas Present – Disney Channel
Laura Vandervoort – Mom's Got a Date with a Vampire – Disney Channel
Tia & Tamera Mowry – Seventeen Again – Showtime
Vanessa Lengies – Ratz – Showtime
Kimberly J. Brown – Quints – Disney Channel

Best Performance in a TV Movie (Comedy): Supporting Young Actor
★ Tyler Hynes – The Other Me – Disney Channel
Tahj Mowry – Seventeen Again – Showtime
Max Morrow – Santa Who? – ABC/Wonderful World of Disney
Jake Epstein – Quints – Disney Channel

Best Performance in a TV Movie (Comedy): Supporting Young Actress
★ Brenda Song – The Ultimate Christmas Present – Disney Channel
Caitlin Wachs – Phantom of the Megaplex – Disney Channel
Caroline Elliot – Ratz – Showtime
Kaitlin Cullum – Growing Up Brady – NBC

Best Performance in a TV Movie (Comedy or Drama): Young Actor Age 10 or Under
★ Myles Jeffrey – Mom's Got a Date with a Vampire – Disney Channel
Matt Weinberg – The Last Dance – CBS
Sam Smith – Oliver Twist – PBS
Jacob Smith – Phantom of the Megaplex – Disney Channel
Stephen Joffe – The Wishing Tree – Showtime
Spencer Breslin – The Ultimate Christmas Present – Disney Channel

Best Performance in a TV Movie (Comedy or Drama): Young Actress Age 10 or Under
★ Jodelle Ferland – Mermaid – Showtime
Kaleigh Nevin – The Wishing Tree – Showtime
Hallie Kate Eisenberg – The Miracle Worker – CBS/Wonderful World of Disney
Arreale Davis – Up, Up and Away – Disney Channel
Channing Carson – The Last Dance – CBS
Charlotte Arnold – Custody of the Heart – Lifetime

Best Performance in a TV Series

Best Performance in a TV Drama Series: Leading Young Actor
★ Robert Clark – The Zack Files – Fox Family
Lee Thompson Young – The Famous Jett Jackson – Disney Channel
Arjay Smith – The Journey of Allen Strange – Nickelodeon
Jeremy Foley – Caitlin's Way – Nickelodeon

Best Performance in a TV Drama Series: Leading Young Actress
★ Alexis Bledel – Gilmore Girls – Warner Bros
Lindsay Felton – Caitlin's Way – Nickelodeon
Jessica Alba – Dark Angel – Fox

Best Performance in a TV Drama Series: Supporting Young Actor
★ Miko Hughes – Roswell – WB Network
Robert Iler – The Sopranos – HBO
Dan Byrd – Any Day Now – Lifetime
Ryan Sommers Baum – The Famous Jett Jackson – Disney Channel
Tony Barriere – Any Day Now – Lifetime
Michael Angarano – Cover Me – USA Network Series

Best Performance in a TV Drama Series: Supporting Young Actress
★ Michelle Trachtenberg – Buffy the Vampire Slayer – WB
Jamie-Lynn Sigler – The Sopranos – HBO
Shari Dyon Perry – Any Day Now – Lifetime
Mae Middleton – Any Day Now – Lifetime
Olivia Friedman – Any Day Now – Lifetime
Kerry Duff – The Famous Jett Jackson – Disney Channel

Best Performance in a TV Drama Series: Guest Starring Young Actor
★ Michal Suchanek – Mysterious Ways – PAX
Andrew Sandler – Profiler – NBC
Shawn Pyfrom – Touched By An Angel – CBS
J.B. Gaynor – Family Law – CBS
Andrew Ducote – Early Edition – Family Channel
Trevor Blumas – Twice In a Lifetime – PAX

Best Performance in a TV Drama Series: Guest Starring Young Actress
★ Brooke Anne Smith – 7th Heaven – WB
Ashley Michelle Tisdale – Boston Public – FOX
Jamie Lauren – 7th Heaven – WB
Elisabeth Moss – The West Wing – NBC
Rachel David – Charmed – FOX

Best Performance in a TV Comedy Series: Leading Young Actor
★ Frankie Muniz – Malcolm in the Middle – Fox
Robert Ri'chard – Cousin Skeeter – Nickelodeon
Shia LaBeouf – Even Stevens – Disney

Best Performance in a TV Comedy Series: Leading Young Actress
★ Christy Carlson Romano – Even Stevens – Disney
Mila Kunis – That '70s Show – Fox
Amanda Bynes – The Amanda Show – Nickelodeon

Best Performance in a TV Comedy Series: Supporting Young Actor
★ Craig Lamar Traylor – Malcolm in the Middle – FOX
Martin Spanjers – Daddio – NBC
Dee Jay Daniels – The Hughleys – UPN
John Francis Daley – The Geena Davis Show – ABC

Best Performance in a TV Comedy Series: Supporting Young Actress
★ Cristina Kernan – Daddio – NBC
Brianne Prather – The Jersey – Disney Channel
Ashley Monique Clark – The Hughleys – UPN

Best Performance in a TV Comedy Series: Guest Starring Young Performer
★ Joey Zimmerman – Becker – CBS
Jenna Rose Morrison – The Amanda Show – Nickelodeon
Miles Marisco – The Jersey – Disney Channel
Ty Hodges – Even Stevens – Disney Channel
Ashley Edner – Malcolm in the Middle – FOX

Best Performance in a TV Series (Comedy or Drama): Young Actor Age Ten or Under
★ Alvin Alvarez – The Brothers Garcia – Nickelodeon
Erik Per Sullivan – Malcolm in the Middle – FOX
Mitch Holleman – Daddio – NBC

Best Performance in a TV Series (Comedy or Drama): Young Actress Age Ten or Under
★ Karle Warren – Judging Amy – CBS
Makenzie Vega – The Geena Davis Show – ABC
Madylin Sweeten – Everybody Loves Raymond – CBS

Best Performance in a Daytime TV Series

Best Performance in a Daytime TV Series: Young Actor
★ Jesse McCartney – All My Children – ABC
Justin Torkildsen – The Bold and the Beautiful – CBS
Logan O'Brien – General Hospital – ABC
Billy Kay – Guiding Light – CBS
Penn Badgley – The Young and the Restless – NBC

Best Performance in a Daytime TV Series: Young Actress
★ Brittany Snow – Guiding Light – CBS
Mary Elizabeth Winstead – Passions – NBC
Kirsten Storms – Days of Our Lives – NBC
Jennifer Finnigan – The Bold and the Beautiful – CBS
Ashley Lyn Cafagna – The Bold and the Beautiful – CBS

Best Performance in a Voice-Over

Best Performance in a Voice-Over (TV / Film / Video): Young Actor
★ Thomas Dekker – An American Tail: The Mystery of the Night Monster – Universal Pictures Home Video
Spencer Klein – Hey Arnold! – Nickelodeon
Marc Donato – Animal Shelf – Fox Family
Rickey D'Shon Collins – Recess – ABC
Joseph Ashton – Rocket Power – Nickelodeon

Best Performance in a Voice-Over (TV / Film / Video): Young Actress
★ Emily Hart – Sabrina: The Animated Series – UPN
Francesca Marie Smith – Hey Arnold! – Nickelodeon
Olivia Hack – Hey Arnold! – ABC
Kristin Fairlie – Little Bear – Nickelodeon
Tanya Donato – Sailor Moon – Cartoon Network

Best Ensemble Performance

Best Ensemble in a TV Series (Drama or Comedy)
★ Once and Again – ABCEvan Rachel Wood, Julia Whelan and Meredith DeaneSo Weird – Disney Channel
Eric Lively, Erik von Detten, Patrick Levis and Alexz Johnson
Malcolm in the Middle – Fox
Frankie Muniz, Justin Berfield, Erik Per Sullivan, Craig Lamar Traylor and Christopher Masterson
The Jersey – Disney Channel
Michael Galeota, Courtnee Draper, Theo Greenly and Jermaine Williams
The Brothers Garcia – Nickelodeon
Alvin Alvarez, Bobby Gonzalez, Jeffrey Licon and Vaneza Leza Pitynski

Best Ensemble in a TV Movie
★ Finding Buck McHenry – ShowtimeMichael Schiffman, Megan Bower, Duane McLaughlin, Marcello MelecaThe Other Me – Disney Channel
Andrew Lawrence, Brenden Jefferson, Tyler Hynes, Sarah Gadon, Alison Pill

Best Ensemble in a Feature Film
★ My Dog Skip – Warner BrosFrankie Muniz, Cody Linley, Bradley Coryell, Daylan Honeycutt, Caitlin WachsThe Patriot – Columbia Pictures
Gregory Smith, Trevor Morgan, Skye McCole Bartusiak, Logan Lerman, Bryan Chafin, Mika Boorem

Best Family Entertainment
Best Family TV Movie / Pilot / Mini-series: Cable
★ A Storm in Summer – ShowtimeThe Wishing Tree – Showtime
Seventeen Again – Showtime
Run the Wild Fields – Showtime
Mom's Got a Date with a Vampire – Disney Channel
Miracle in Lane 2 – Disney Channel
The Color of Friendship – Disney Channel

Best Family TV Movie / Pilot / Mini-series: Network
★ Papa's Angels – CBSYesterday's Children – CBS
To Brave Alaska – ABC
Second Honeymoon – CBS
Santa Who? – ABC
The Growing Pains Movie – ABC
Cupid & Cate – CBS/Hallmark
Baby – TNT

Best Educational TV Show or Series
★ Walking with Dinosaurs – Discovery ChannelNature – PBS
Lon Chaney: A Thousand Faces – TCM
Founding Fathers – History Channel
The Children of the Charbannes – HBO
Awesome Pawsome – Animal Planet

Best Family TV Drama Series
★ Gilmore Girls – WBTouched by an Angel – CBS
7th Heaven – WB
Mysterious Ways – NBC
Judging Amy – CBS
The Famous Jett Jackson – Disney Channel

Best Family TV Comedy Series
★ The Brothers Garcia – NickelodeonThe Jersey – Disney Channel
The Hughleys – UPN
Everybody Loves Raymond – CBS
Even Stevens – Disney Channel
Ed – NBC

Best Animated TV Series
★ Sabrina: The Animated Series – ABCSheep in the Big City – Cartoon Network
Rolie Polie Olie – Disney Channel
Blue's Clues – Nickelodeon
Bear in the Big Blue House – Disney Channel
Angela Anaconda – Family Channel

Best Family Feature Film – Drama
★ My Dog Skip – Warner BrosRemember the Titans – Disney
Finding Forrester – Columbia Pictures
Family Tree – Warner Vision
The Family Man – Universal

Best Family Feature Film – Comedy
★ Dr. Seuss' How the Grinch Stole Christmas – UniversalSnow Day – Paramount
Return to Me – MGM
The Flintstones in Viva Rock Vegas – Universal
Disney's The Kid – Walt Disney

Best Family Feature Film – Animation
★ Chicken Run – DreamWorksRugrats in Paris: The Movie – Paramount
The Emperor's New Groove – Walt Disney
Dinosaur – Buena Vista
Blue's Big Musical Movie – Paramount

Special awards
Best Young Actor in an International Film
★ Jamie Bell – Billy Elliot (United Kingdom) – Produced by Working Title Films, distributed by Universal FocusBest Young Actress in an International Film
★ Zhang Ziyi – Crouching Tiger, Hidden Dragon (China) – Distributed by Sony Pictures ClassicsBest International Family Film
★ Billy Elliot – Produced by Working Title Films, distributed by Universal FocusBest Short Foreign Film
★ Sanzhyra – Russian Kinoglaz Company – Producer: Yevgeniya TirdatovaOutstanding Young International Performer
★ Michael Junior (Belgium) – PBS Special: Michael Junior – CD: DreamlandOutstanding Young Female Entertainer
★ Lauren Frost – Barbra Streisand concert – Madison Square GardenOutstanding Young Performer in Live Theater
★ Tiffany SolanoFormer Child Star Life Achievement Award
★ Jay Underwood – The Boy Who Could Fly

Former Child Star Life Achievement Award
★ Charlene Tilton – Dallas

Outstanding Young Performers in a National Commercial Featuring Youth
★ Daniel Smorgon (Actor) – Bank of America
★ Sam Schwarz (Voice Over) – Bank of America – Produced by Bozell Advertising, New York

Outstanding Young Actress in a National Television Commercial
★ Steffani Brass – Disney Cruise Line

Outstanding Achievement in an International Commercial Featuring Youth
★ Nes Bitton (Israel) Diver/Actor – 'Diver' – Cheltenham & Gloucester, UK
★ Nimrod Mashiach (Israel) Diver/Actor – 'Diver' – Cheltenham & Gloucester, UK – Produced by Saatchi & Saatchi, London

References

External links
Official site

Young Artist Awards ceremonies
2000 film awards
2000 television awards
2001 in California
2001 in American cinema
2001 in American television
April 2001 events in the United States